In mathematics, the Albanese variety , named for Giacomo Albanese, is a generalization of the Jacobian variety of a curve.

Precise statement
(It is an analytic variety in this case; it need not be algebraic.)

Properties

is defined, along which the 1-forms pull back. This morphism is unique up to a translation on the Albanese variety. To see the former note that the Albanese variety is dual to the Picard variety, whose tangent space at the identity is given by  That  is a result of Jun-ichi Igusa in the bibliography.

Roitman's theorem
If the ground field k is algebraically closed, the Albanese map  can be shown to factor over a group homomorphism (also called the Albanese map)

Replacing the Chow group by Suslin–Voevodsky algebraic singular homology after the introduction of Motivic cohomology Roitman's theorem has been obtained and reformulated in the motivic framework. For example, a similar result holds for non-singular quasi-projective varieties. Further versions of Roitman's theorem are available for normal schemes. Actually, the most general formulations of Roitman's theorem (i.e. homological, cohomological, and Borel–Moore) involve the motivic Albanese complex  and have been proven by Luca Barbieri-Viale and Bruno Kahn (see the references III.13).

Connection to Picard variety
The Albanese variety is dual to the Picard variety (the connected component of zero of the Picard scheme classifying invertible sheaves on V):

For algebraic curves, the Abel–Jacobi theorem implies that the Albanese and Picard varieties are isomorphic.

See also
Intermediate Jacobian
Albanese scheme
Motivic Albanese

Notes & references

Abelian varieties